Gilbert Van Cleve (December 15, 1880 – May 5, 1951) was an American athlete. He competed in the long jump and triple jump events at the 1904 Summer Olympics.

References

1880 births
1951 deaths
Athletes (track and field) at the 1904 Summer Olympics
American male long jumpers
American male triple jumpers
Olympic track and field athletes of the United States
People from Staunton, Illinois
Track and field athletes from Illinois
Olympic male long jumpers
Olympic male triple jumpers